Qasim Akhtar (born 8 June 1991) is an English actor, known for his roles as Chesney Karib in the Channel 4 comedy drama Shameless and Zeedan Nazir in the ITV soap opera Coronation Street.

Career
Akhtar appeared in Mischief Night in 2006. He later joined the cast of Shameless and played the role of Chesney Karib. He has also appeared in Waterloo Road.

In 2014, Akhtar was cast as Zeedan Nazir, the son of Kal Nazir (Jimi Mistry), in the long-running soap opera Coronation Street. In March 2018 it was announced that Akhtar would leave the show later in the year. He made his final appearance on 23 May 2018. In August 2021, it was announced that he would be reprising his role as Zeedan from September 2021 onwards.

References

External links
 

1991 births
Living people
English male child actors
English male television actors